The 2017 Pittsburgh Pirates season was the franchise's 136th season overall, 131st season as a member of the National League, and the 17th season at PNC Park. They failed to improve on their record from the previous season and finished fourth in the NL Central. The Pirates failed to qualify for the playoffs for the second consecutive season.

Offseason and spring training
Infielder Jung-ho Kang was found guilty by a South Korean court for his third offense of driving under the influence, and as a result, the initial request for a work visa to enter the United States for the 2017 season was denied. He would miss the whole season with the Pirates.

The Pirates recorded a 19–12 win–loss record in preseason spring training, the third best record in the Grapefruit League. In addition, two of their games finished tied and were therefore not included in the standings.

Regular season

April
April 3 – The Pirates lost on Opening Day to the Boston Red Sox 5–3.
April 7 – In their home opener against the Atlanta Braves, the Pirates defeated the Braves 5–4. The Pirates would go on to win all three games of the series to sweep the Braves.
April 9 – Starling Marte hit a walk-off home run in the tenth inning to propel the Pirates to a 5–4 win and series sweep over the Braves.
April 12 – The Pirates were swept by the Cincinnati Reds following a 9–2 loss.
April 16 – Following a four-game losing streak, the Pirates rally to beat the Chicago Cubs 6–1 to sweep the three-game series at Wrigley Field.
April 18 – Starling Marte was suspended 80 games after testing positive for nandrolone, a performance-enhancing substance; he will not be eligible to return until after the team's 93rd game on July 17 and is ineligible for postseason play if the team qualifies.
April 19 – The Pirates were swept following three straight 2–1 losses to the St. Louis Cardinals. The Pirates have been swept in three of the five series to date and have swept their opponent in the other two series to date.
April 22 – The Pirates lost to the New York Yankees 11–5 after beating them in the first game of the series. The series marks the first series of the year where the Pirates did not sweep their opponent nor did they get swept.
April 24 - the Pirates fielded the first baseball player to be born and raised in Lithuania, to reach the major leagues, Dovydas Neverauskas. In 1933, Joe Zapustas was the first Lithuanian-born player to play in MLB, as a member of the Philadelphia Athletics, however he grew up in Boston.
April 26 - The Pirates promoted South African Gift Ngoepe from the AAA Indianapolis Indians; making him the first African-born player in MLB history.
The Pirates finished the month with a win–loss record of 11–13, fourth in the NL Central at 2.0 games out of first.

May
May 3 – Iván Nova was named NL Pitcher of the Month for April.

June
Andrew McCutchen is named the National League Player of the Month

July
July 2 – Josh Harrison is elected to the 2017 Major League Baseball All-Star Game.
July 18 – Starling Marte is reactivated after performance-enhancing drug suspension

August
August 6 – Sean Rodriguez, in his first game since being re-acquired by the Pirates a day earlier, hits a walk-off home run in the twelfth inning to give the Pirates a 5–4 victory over the San Diego Padres.
August 20 – The Pirates defeated the St. Louis Cardinals, 6–3, in the 2017 MLB Little League Classic held at Bowman Field, located in Williamsport, Pennsylvania. 
August 23 – Josh Harrison became the first player in MLB history to break up a no-hitter in extra innings with a walk-off home run. The home run was hit in the tenth inning, off of  pitcher Rich Hill, to give the Pirates a 1–0 win over the Los Angeles Dodgers.

September
September 4 - Josh Bell broke the National League record for most home runs by a rookie switch hitter, hitting his 24th of the season off of Jake Arrieta, in a 12-0 Pirates' rout of the Chicago Cubs 
September 5 - Longtime Pirates TV broadcaster Kent Tekulve announced his retirement, after the Pirates' 4–3 win over the visiting Chicago Cubs.

Season standings

National League Central

National League playoff standings

Record vs. opponents

Detailed records

Game log

|-style="background:#fbb"
| 1 || April 3 ||@ Red Sox || 3–5 || Porcello (1–0) || Cole (0–1) || Kimbrel (1) || 36,594 || 0–1 || L1
|-style="background:#fbb"
| 2 || April 5 ||@ Red Sox || 0–3 (12) || Kelly (1–0) || Bastardo (0–1) || — || 36,137 || 0–2 || L2
|- style="text-align:center; background:#bbb;"
| – || April 6 ||@ Red Sox || colspan=7| PPD, RAIN; rescheduled for April 13
|-style="background:#cfc"
| 3 || April 7 ||Braves || 5–4 || Nova (1–0) || Foltynewicz (0–1) || Watson (1) || 36,484 || 1–2 || W1
|-style="background:#cfc"
| 4 || April 8 ||Braves || 6–4 || Kuhl (1–0) || Dickey (0–1) || Watson (2) || 33,004 || 2–2 || W2
|-style="background:#cfc"
| 5 || April 9 ||Braves || 5–4 (10) || Rivero (1–0) || Ramírez (0–1) || — || 22,713 || 3–2 || W3
|-style="background:#fbb"
| 6 || April 10 ||Reds || 1–7 || Lorenzen (1–0) || Glasnow (0–1) || — || 28,264 || 3–3 || L1
|-style="background:#fbb"
| 7 || April 11 ||Reds || 2–6 || Storen (1–0) || Nicasio (0–1) || Iglesias (3) || 11,027 || 3–4 || L2
|-style="background:#fbb"
| 8 || April 12 ||Reds || 2–9 || Garrett (2–0) || Nova (1–1) || — || 12,327 || 3–5 || L3
|-style="background:#fbb"
| 9 || April 13 ||@ Red Sox || 3–4 || Barnes (2–0) || Nicasio (0–2) || Kimbrel (3) || 32,400 || 3–6 || L4
|-style="background:#cfc"
| 10 || April 14 ||@ Cubs || 4–2 || Cole (1–1) || Hendricks (1–1) || Watson (3) || 40,430 || 4–6 || W1
|-style="background:#cfc"
| 11 || April 15 ||@ Cubs || 8–7 || Williams (1–0) || Duensing (0–1) || Watson (4) || 41,814 || 5–6 || W2
|-style="background:#cfc"
| 12 || April 16 ||@ Cubs || 6–1 || Taillon (1–0) || Uehara (0–1) || — || 39,422 || 6–6 || W3
|-style="background:#fbb"
| 13 || April 17 ||@ Cardinals || 1–2 || Lynn (1–1) || Nova (1–2) || Oh (1) || 40,172 || 6–7 || L1
|-style="background:#fbb"
| 14 || April 18 ||@ Cardinals || 1–2 || Leake (2–1) || Kuhl (1–1) || Oh (2) || 38,806 || 6–8 || L2
|-style="background:#fbb
| 15 || April 19 ||@ Cardinals || 1–2 || Wacha (2–1) || Cole (1–2) || Rosenthal (1) || 40,182 || 6–9 || L3
|-style="background:#cfc
| 16 || April 21 ||Yankees || 6–3 || Nicasio (1–2) || Sabathia (2–1) || Watson (5) || 30,565 || 7–9 || W1
|-style="background:#fbb
| 17 || April 22 ||Yankees || 5–11 || Betances (2–1) || Rivero (1–1) || — || 36,140 || 7–10 || L1
|-style="background:#cfc
| 18 || April 23 ||Yankees || 2–1 || Nova (2–2) || Montgomery (1–1) || Watson (6) || 27,840 || 8–10 || W1
|-style="background:#fbb
| 19 || April 24 ||Cubs || 3–14 || Anderson (2–0) || Kuhl (1–2) || — || 13,445 || 8–11 || L1
|-style="background:#fbb
| 20 || April 25 ||Cubs || 0–1 || Hendricks (2–1) || Cole (1–3) || Davis (5) || 15,326 || 8–12 || L2
|-style="background:#cfc"
| 21 || April 26 ||Cubs || 6–5 || LeBlanc (1–0) || Lester (0–1) || Watson (7) || 16,904 || 9–12 || W1
|-style="background:#cfc
| 22 || April 28 ||@ Marlins || 12–2 || Taillon (2–0) || Conley (1–2) || — || 19,690 || 10–12 || W2
|-style="background:#cfc
| 23 || April 29 ||@ Marlins || 4–0 || Nova (3–2) || Straily (1–2) || — || 33,152 || 11–12 || W3
|-style="background:#fbb
| 24 || April 30 ||@ Marlins || 3–10 || McGowan (1–0) || Williams (1–1) || — || 26,245 || 11–13 || L1
|-

|-style="background:#fbb
| 25 || May 1 ||@ Reds || 3–4 (10) || Lorenzen (2–0) || Hudson (0–1) || — || 14,753 || 11–14 || L2
|-style="background:#cfc
| 26 || May 2 ||@ Reds || 12–3 || Glasnow (1–1) || Feldman (1–3) || LeBlanc (1) || 13,909 || 12–14 || W1
|-style="background:#fbb
| 27 || May 3 ||@ Reds || 2–7 || Davis (1–1) || Taillon (2–1) || — || 14,297 || 12–15 || L1
|-style="background:#fbb
| 28 || May 4 ||@ Reds || 2–4 || Adleman (1–1) || Nova (3–3) || Iglesias (5) || 17,896 || 12–16 || L2
|-style="background:#cfc
| 29 || May 5 ||Brewers || 4–0 || LeBlanc (2–0) || Scahill (0–1) || — || 21,129 || 13–16 || W1
|-style="background:#cfc
| 30 || May 6 ||Brewers || 2–1 (10) || Watson (1–0) || Torres (1–3) || — || 22,902 || 14–16 || W2
|-style="background:#fbb
| 31 || May 7 ||Brewers || 2–6 || Davies (3–2) || Glasnow (1–2)  || — || 25,108 || 14–17 || L1
|-style="background:#fbb
| 32 || May 8 ||@ Dodgers || 1–12 || Wood (3–0) || Williams (1–2) || — || 37,314 || 14–18 || L2
|-style="background:#fbb
| 33 || May 9 ||@ Dodgers || 3–4 (10) || Jansen (2–0) || Hudson (0–2) || — || 47,720 || 14–19 || L3
|-style="background:#fbb
| 34 || May 10 ||@ Dodgers || 2–5 || Maeda (3–2) || Kuhl (1–3) || — || 40,719 || 14–20 || L4
|-style="background:#fbb
| 35 || May 11 ||@ Diamondbacks || 1–2 || Greinke (4–2) || Cole (1–4) || Rodney (9) || 17,527 || 14–21 || L5
|-style="background:#fbb
| 36 || May 12 ||@ Diamondbacks || 4–11 || Corbin (3–4) || Glasnow (1–3) || — || 21,911 || 14–22 || L6
|-style="background:#cfc
| 37 || May 13 ||@ Diamondbacks || 4–3 || Williams (2–2) || Walker (3–3) || Watson (8) || 31,673 || 15–22 || W1
|-style="background:#cfc
| 38 || May 14 ||@ Diamondbacks || 6–4 (10) || Watson (2–0) || Wilhelmsen (0–1) || — || 34,088 || 16–22 || W2
|-style="background:#fbb
| 39 || May 16 ||Nationals || 4–8 || Strasburg (4–1) ||  Kuhl (1–4) || — || 16,992 || 16–23 || L1
|-style="background:#cfc
| 40 || May 17 ||Nationals || 6–1 || Cole (2–4) ||  Turner (2–2) || — || 18,803 || 17–23 || W1
|-style="background:#cfc
| 41 || May 18 ||Nationals || 10–4 || Glasnow (2–3) ||  Roark (3–2) || — || 27,728 || 18–23 || W2
|-style="background:#fbb
| 42 || May 19 ||Phillies || 2–7 || Hellickson (5–1) || Williams (2–3) || — || 25,795 || 18–24 || L1
|-style="background:#cfc
| 43 || May 20 ||Phillies || 6–3 || Nova (4–3) || Velasquez (2–4) || Watson (9) || 32,572 || 19–24 || W1
|-style="background:#cfc
| 44 || May 21 ||Phillies || 1–0 || LeBlanc (3–0) || Nola (2–1) ||  Watson (10) || 24,445 || 20–24 || W2
|-style="background:#fbb
| 45 || May 22 ||@ Braves || 2–5 ||Foltynewicz (3–4) || Cole (2–5) || Johnson (9) || 21,896 || 20–25 || L1
|-style="background:#fbb
| 46 || May 23 ||@ Braves || 5–6 || Jackson (1–0) || Watson (2–1) || — || 25,040 || 20–26 || L2
|-style="background:#cfc
| 47 || May 24 ||@ Braves || 12–5 (10) || Rivero (2–1) || Collmenter (0–2) || — || 25,981 || 21–26 || W1
|-style="background:#cfc
| 48 || May 25 ||@ Braves || 9–4 || Nova (5–3) || Colón (2–5)|| — || 33,713 || 22–26 || W2
|-style="background:#fbb
| 49 || May 26 ||Mets || 1–8 || deGrom (4–1) || Kuhl (1–5) || — || 29,408 || 22–27 || L1
|-style="background:#cfc
| 50 || May 27 ||Mets || 5–4 (10) || Watson (3–1) || Pill (0–1) || — || 31,658 || 23–27 || W1
|-style="background:#fbb
| 51 || May 28 ||Mets || 2–7 || Harvey (4–3) || Glasnow (2–4) || — || 21,828 || 23–28 || L1
|-style="background:#cfc
| 52 || May 29 ||Diamondbacks || 4–3 || Watson (4–1) || Bradley (1–1) || — || 16,939 || 24–28 || W1
|-style="background:#fbb
| 53 || May 30 ||Diamondbacks || 0–3 || Ray (5–3) || Nova (5–4) || — || 14,996 || 24–29 || L1
|-style="background:#fbb
| 54 || May 31 ||Diamondbacks || 5–6 (14) || McFarland (3–0) || Mariñez (0–3) || — || 20,990 || 24–30 || L2
|-

|-style="background:#cfc
| 55 || June 2 ||@ Mets || 12–7 || Cole (3–5) || Sewald (0–1) || — || 33,047 || 25–30 || W1
|-style="background:#fbb
| 56 || June 3 ||@ Mets || 2–4 || Gsellman (4–3) || Glasnow (2–5) || Reed (8) || 34,035 || 25–31 || L1
|-style="background:#cfc
| 57 || June 4 ||@ Mets || 11–1 || Williams (3–3) || Pill (0–2) || — || 35,323 || 26–31 || W1
|- bgcolor=#fbb
| 58 || June 6 ||@ Orioles || 5–6 (10) || Brach (1–1) || LeBlanc (3–1) || — || 26,724 || 26–32 || L1
|- bgcolor=#fbb
| 59 || June 7 ||@ Orioles || 6–9 (11) || Givens (6–0) || LeBlanc (3–2) || — || 19,957 || 26–33 || L2
|- bgcolor=#fbb
| 60 || June 8 ||Marlins || 1–7 || Vólquez (3–7) || Cole (3–6) || — || 21,744 || 26–34 || L3
|- bgcolor=#fbb
| 61 || June 9 ||Marlins || 5–12 || McGowan (4–0) ||Glasnow (2–6) || — || 23,950 || 26–35 ||L4
|- bgcolor=#cfc
| 62 || June 10 ||Marlins || 7–6 || Hudson (1–2) || Phelps (2–3) || Rivero (1) || 27,275 || 27–35 || W1
|- bgcolor=#cfc
| 63 || June 11 ||Marlins || 3–1 || Nova (6–4) || Locke (0–2) || Rivero (2) || 22,925 || 28–35 || W2
|- bgcolor=#cfc
| 64 || June 12 ||Rockies || 7–2 || Taillon (3–1) || Freeland (7–4) || — || 16,320 || 29–35 || W3
|- bgcolor=#cfc
| 65 || June 13 ||Rockies || 5–2 || Cole (4–6) || Ottavino (0–1) || — || 16,764 || 30–35 || W4
|- bgcolor=#fbb
| 66 || June 14 ||Rockies || 1–5 || Márquez (5–3) || Kuhl (1–6)|| — || 17,308 || 30–36 || L1
|- bgcolor=#fbb
| 67 || June 16 ||Cubs || 5–9 || Uehara (2–3) || Nicasio (1–3) || — || 25,420 || 30–37 || L2
|- bgcolor=#cfc
| 68 || June 17 ||Cubs || 4–3 || Nova (7–4) || Arrieta (6–5) || Rivero (3) || 34,383 || 31–37 || W1
|- bgcolor=#fbb
| 69 || June 18 ||Cubs || 1–7 || Lackey (5–7) || Taillon (3–2) ||—|| 34,539 || 31–38 || L1
|- bgcolor=#cfc
| 70 || June 19 ||@ Brewers || 8–1 || Cole (5–6) || Garza (3–3) || — || 25,489 || 32–38 || W1
|- bgcolor=#cfc
| 71 || June 20 ||@ Brewers || 7–3 || Kuhl (2–6) || Davies (7–4) || — || 23,982 || 33–38 || W2
|- bgcolor=#fbb
| 72 || June 21 ||@ Brewers || 3–4 || Drake (3–2) || Hudson (1–3) || Knebel (11) || 25,134 || 33–39 || L1
|- bgcolor=#fbb
| 73 || June 22 ||@ Brewers || 2–4 || Anderson (6–2) || Nova (7–5) || Knebel (12)|| 28,428 || 33–40 || L2
|- bgcolor=#cfc
| 74 || June 23 ||@ Cardinals || 4–3 || Rivero (3–1) || Oh (1–4) || — || 47,112 || 34–40 || W1
|- bgcolor=#cfc
| 75 || June 24 ||@ Cardinals || 7–3 || Cole (6–6) || Lynn (5–5) || — || 46,735 || 35–40 || W2
|- bgcolor=#fbb
| 76 || June 25 ||@ Cardinals || 4–8 || Rosenthal (2–3) || Nicasio (1–4) || — || 43,719 || 35–41 || L1
|- bgcolor=#fbb
| 77 || June 27 || Rays || 2–4 (10) || Colomé (2–3) || Rivero (3–2) || Hunter (1) || 20,424 || 35–42 || L2
|- bgcolor=#cfc
| 78 || June 28 || Rays || 6–2 || Nova (8–5) || Snell (0–5) || — || 21,582 || 36–42 || W1
|- bgcolor=#cfc
| 79 || June 29 || Rays || 4–0 || Taillon (4–2) || Archer (6–5) || — || 22,595 || 37–42 || W2
|- bgcolor=#fbb
| 80 || June 30 || Giants || 5–13 || Cueto (6–7) || Cole (6–7) || — || 26,407 || 37–43 || L1
|-

|- bgcolor=#fbb
| 81 || July 1 || Giants || 1–2 (11) || Osich (2–1) || Hudson (1–4) || Dyson (1) || 27,247 || 37–44 || L2
|- bgcolor=#fbb
| 82 || July 2 || Giants || 3–5 || Samardzija (4–9) || Watson (4–2) || Dyson (2) || 32,144 || 37–45 || L3
|- bgcolor=#fbb
| 83 || July 3 ||@ Phillies || 0–4 || Nola (6–5) || Nova (8–6) || — || 26,498 || 37–46 || L4
|- bgcolor=#cfc
| 84 || July 4 ||@ Phillies || 3–0 || Taillon (5–1) || Leiter (1–1) || Rivero (4) || 24,087 || 38–46 || W1
|- bgcolor=#cfc
| 85 || July 5 ||@ Phillies || 5–2 || Cole (7–7) || Lively (1–4) || Rivero (5) || 19,099 || 39–46 || W2
|- bgcolor=#cfc
| 86 || July 6 ||@ Phillies || 6–3 || Kuhl (3–6) || Benoit (1–3) || Nicasio (1) || 33,059 || 40–46 || W3
|- bgcolor=#fbb
| 87 || July 7 ||@ Cubs || 1–6 || Edwards Jr. (3–1) || Williams (3–4) || — || 41,294 || 40–47 || L1
|- bgcolor=#cfc
| 88 || July 8 ||@ Cubs || 4–2 || Nova (9–6) || Arrieta (8–7) || Rivero (6) || 41,865 || 41–47 || W1
|- bgcolor=#cfc
| 89 || July 9 ||@ Cubs || 14–3 || Schugel (1–0) || Lester (5–6) ||—|| 41,604 || 42–47 || W2
|-style="text-align:center; background:#bbcaff;"
|colspan="10"|88th All-Star Game in Miami, Florida
|- bgcolor=#cfc
| 90 || July 14 || Cardinals || 5–2 || Rivero (4–2) || Oh (1–5) || — || 24,988 || 43–47 || W3
|- bgcolor=#fbb
| 91 || July 15 || Cardinals || 0–4 || Lynn (8–6) || Taillon (5–3) || — || 35,658 || 43–48 || L1
|- bgcolor=#cfc
| 92 || July 16 || Cardinals || 4–3 || LeBlanc (4–2) || Cecil (1–3) || — || 29,247 || 44–48 || W1
|- bgcolor=#cfc
| 93 || July 17 || Brewers || 4–2 || Hudson (2–4) || Hader (1–1) || Rivero (7) || 18,506 || 45–48 || W2
|- bgcolor=#cfc
| 94 || July 18 || Brewers || 4–3 || Nova (10–6) || Drake (3–3)  || Rivero (8) || 20,462 || 46–48 || W3
|- bgcolor=#cfc
| 95 || July 19 || Brewers || 3–2 (10) || Watson (5–2) || Hughes (3–2) || — || 24,401 || 47–48 || W4
|- bgcolor=#cfc
| 96 || July 20 || Brewers || 4–2 || Taillon (6–3) || Nelson (8–5) || Rivero (9) || 33,493 || 48–48 || W5
|- bgcolor=#cfc
| 97 || July 21 ||@ Rockies || 13–5 || Williams (4–4) || Hoffman (6–2) || — || 41,192 || 49–48 || W6
|- bgcolor=#fbb
| 98 || July 22 ||@ Rockies || 3–7 || Márquez (8–4) || Kuhl (3–7) || Holland (31) || 48,235 || 49–49 || L1
|- bgcolor=#fbb
| 99 || July 23 ||@ Rockies || 3–13 || Freeland (10–7) || Nova (10–7) || — || 40,118 || 49–50 || L2
|- bgcolor=#cfc
| 100 || July 24 ||@ Giants || 10–3 || Cole (8–7) || Cain (3–9) || — || 40,030 || 50–50 || W1
|- bgcolor=#fbb
| 101 || July 25 ||@ Giants || 3–11 || Bumgarner (1–4) || Taillon (6–4) || Stratton (1) || 41,232 || 50–51 || L1
|- bgcolor=#fbb
| 102 || July 26 ||@ Giants || 1–2 || Samardzija (5–11) || Watson (5–3) || Dyson (6) || 41,038 || 50–52 || L2
|- bgcolor=#fbb
| 103 || July 28 ||@ Padres || 2–3 || Wood (2–3) || Hudson (2–5) || Hand (6) || 24,215 || 50–53 || L3
|- bgcolor=#fbb
| 104 || July 29 ||@ Padres || 2–4 || Lamet (5–4) || Nova (10–8) || Yates (1) || 37,286 || 50–54 || L4
|- bgcolor=#cfc
| 105 || July 30 ||@ Padres || 7–1 || Cole (9–7) || Richard (5–12) || — || 30,267 || 51–54 || W1
|-

|- bgcolor=#fbb
| 106 || August 1 || Reds || 1–9 || Bailey (3–5) || Taillon (6–5) || — || 22,403 || 51–55 || L1
|- bgcolor=#fbb
| 107 || August 2 || Reds || 2–5 || Lorenzen (6–2) || Benoit (1–5) || Iglesias (18) || 22,367 || 51–56 || L2
|- bgcolor=#cfc
| 108 || August 3 || Reds || 6–0 || Kuhl (4–7) || Romano (2–3) || — || 25,955 || 52–56 || W1
|- bgcolor=#cfc
| 109 || August 4 || Padres || 10–6 || Schugel (2–0)  || Yates (2–2) || — || 32,243 || 53–56 || W2
|- bgcolor=#fbb
| 110 || August 5 || Padres || 2–5 || Lamet (6–4) || Cole (9–8) || Hand (8) || 31,817 || 53–57 || L1
|- bgcolor=#cfc
| 111 || August 6 || Padres || 5–4 (12) || Neverauskas (1–0) || Baumann (0–1) || — || 34,175 || 54–57 || W1
|- bgcolor=#cfc
| 112 || August 7 || Tigers || 3–0 || Williams (5–4) || Zimmermann (7–9) || Nicasio (2) || 21,651 || 55–57 || W2
|- bgcolor=#cfc
| 113 || August 8 || Tigers || 6–3 || Kuhl (5–7) || Boyd (5–6) || Rivero (10) || 25,112 || 56–57 || W3
|- bgcolor=#fbb
| 114 || August 9 ||@ Tigers || 0–10 || Verlander (8–7) || Nova (10–9) || — || 28,902 || 56–58 || L1
|- bgcolor=#cfc
| 115 || August 10 ||@ Tigers || 7–5 || Cole (10–8) || VerHagen (0–2) || Rivero (11) || 33,490 || 57–58 || W1
|- bgcolor=#cfc
| 116 || August 11 ||@ Blue Jays || 4–2 || Taillon (7–5) || Stroman (10–6) || Rivero (12) || 35,965 || 58–58 || W2
|- bgcolor=#fbb
| 117 || August 12 ||@ Blue Jays || 2–7 || Rowley (1–0) || Williams (5–5) || — || 46,179 || 58–59 || L1
|- bgcolor=#fbb
| 118 || August 13 ||@ Blue Jays || 1–7 || Happ (6–8) || Kuhl (5–8) || — || 43,618 || 58–60 || L2
|- bgcolor=#fbb
| 119 || August 15 ||@ Brewers || 1–3 || Davies (14–6) || Nova (10–10) || Knebel (23) || 32,605 || 58–61 || L3
|- bgcolor=#fbb
| 120 || August 16 ||@ Brewers || 6–7 || Swarzak (5–3) || Nicasio (1–5) || Knebel (24) || 32,439 || 58–62 || L4
|- bgcolor=#fbb
| 121 || August 17 || Cardinals || 7–11 || Tuivailala (3–1) || Benoit (1–6) || — || 31,499 || 58–63 || L5
|- bgcolor=#fbb
| 122 || August 18 || Cardinals || 10–11 || Martinez (10–9) || Williams (5–6) || Oh (19) || 29,906 || 58–64 || L6
|- bgcolor=#cfc
| 123 || August 19 || Cardinals || 6–4 || Kuhl (6–8) || Wacha (9–6) || Rivero (13) || 34,660 || 59–64 || W1
|- bgcolor=#cfc
| 124** || August 20 || Cardinals || 6–3 || Nova (11–10) || Leake (7–12) || Rivero (14) || 2,596 || 60–64 || W2
|- bgcolor=#fbb
| 125 || August 21 || Dodgers || 5–6 (12) || Avilan (2–1) || Neverauskas (1–1) || Stripling (2) || 19,094 || 60–65 || L1
|- bgcolor=#fbb
| 126 || August 22 || Dodgers || 5–8 || Watson (7–4) || Barbato (0–1)  ||  Jansen (34) || 17,288 || 60–66 || L2
|- bgcolor=#cfc
| 127 || August 23 || Dodgers || 1–0  (10) || Nicasio (2–5)  || Hill (9–5) || — || 19,859 || 61–66 || W1
|- bgcolor=#fbb
| 128 || August 24 || Dodgers || 2–5 || Ryu (5–6) || Kuhl (6–9) || Morrow (1) || 22,115 || 61–67 || L1
|- bgcolor=#fbb
| 129 || August 25 ||@ Reds || 5–9 || Stephenson (2–4) || Nova (11–11) || — || 20,561 || 61–68 || L2
|- bgcolor=#cfc
| 130 || August 26 ||@ Reds || 1–0 || Cole (11–8) || Castillo (2–7) || Rivero (15) || 35,259 || 62–68 || W1
|- bgcolor=#cfc
| 131 || August 27 ||@ Reds || 5–2 || Schugel (3–0) || Mahle (0–1) || Rivero (16) || 26,155 || 63–68 || W2
|- bgcolor=#fbb
| 132 || August 28 ||@ Cubs || 1–6 || Montgomery (5–6) || Williams (5–7) || — || 38,453 || 63–69 || L1
|- bgcolor=#fbb
| 133 || August 29 ||@ Cubs || 1–4 || Arrieta (14–8) || Kuhl (6–10) || Davis (27) || 37,370 || 63–70 || L2
|- bgcolor=#fbb
| 134 || August 30 ||@ Cubs || 3–17 || Quintana (9–11) || Nova (11–12) || — || 36,628 || 63–71 || L3
|-

|- bgcolor=#fbb
| 135 || September 1 || Reds || 3–7 || Wojciechowski (4–3) || Cole (11–9) || — || 23,569 || 63–72 || L4
|- bgcolor=#cfc
| 136 || September 2 || Reds || 5–0 || Schugel (4–0) || Lorenzen (8–3) || — || 23,529 || 64–72 || W1
|- bgcolor=#cfc
| 137 || September 3 || Reds || 3–1 || Williams (6–7) || Romano (4–6) || Rivero (17) || 24,474 || 65–72 || W2
|- bgcolor=#cfc
| 138 || September 4 || Cubs || 12–0 || Kuhl (7–10) || Arrieta (14–7) || — || 21,068 || 66–72 || W3
|- bgcolor=#cfc
| 139 || September 5 || Cubs || 4–3 || LeBlanc (5–2) || Edwards Jr. (3–4) || Rivero (18) || 14,079 || 67–72 || W4
|- bgcolor=#fbb
| 140 || September 6 || Cubs || 0–1 || Strop (4–4) || Hudson (2–6) || Davis (29) || 17,067 || 67–73 || L1
|- bgcolor=#fbb
| 141 || September 7 || Cubs || 2–8 || Lester (10–7) || Taillon (7–6) || — || 19,201 || 67–74 || L2
|- bgcolor=#fbb
| 142 || September 8 ||@ Cardinals || 1–4 || Weaver (5–1) || Williams (6–8) || Nicasio (3) || 40,966 || 67–75 || L3
|- bgcolor=#fbb
| 143 || September 9 ||@ Cardinals || 3–4 || Lyons (4–0) || Kontos (2–6) || Nicasio (4) || 44,378 || 67–76 || L4
|- bgcolor=#fbb
| 144 || September 10 ||@ Cardinals || 0–7 || Wacha (12–7) || Nova (11–13) || — || 44,683 || 67–77 || L5
|- bgcolor=#cfc
| 145 || September 11 ||@ Brewers || 7–0 || Brault (1–0) || Woodruff (1–2) || — || 27,422 || 68–77 || W1
|- bgcolor=#fbb
| 146 || September 12 ||@ Brewers || 2–5 || Jeffress (4–2) || Cole (11–10) || Knebel (35) || 30,331 || 68–78 || L1
|- bgcolor=#fbb
| 147 || September 13 ||@ Brewers || 2–8 || Anderson (10–3) || Glasnow (2–7) || — || 27,436 || 68–79 || L2
|- bgcolor=#fbb
| 148 || September 15 ||@ Reds || 2–4 || Bailey (5–8) || Kuhl (7–11) || Iglesias (27) || 17,625 || 68–80 || L3
|- bgcolor=#fbb
| 149 || September 16 ||@ Reds || 1–2 || Romano (5–6) || Nova (11–14) || Reed (1) || 25,685 || 68–81 || L4
|- bgcolor=#fbb
| 150 || September 17 ||@ Reds || 2–5 || Stephenson (5–5) || Cole (11–11) || Lorenzen (2) || 22,228 || 68–82 || L5
|- bgcolor=#fbb
| 151 || September 18 || Brewers || 0–3 || Suter (3–2) || Taillon (7–7) || Knebel (36) || 16,283 || 68–83 || L6
|- bgcolor=#fbb
| 152 || September 19 || Brewers || 0–1 || Anderson (11–3) || Williams (6–9) || Knebel (37) || 13,929 || 68–84 || L7
|- bgcolor=#cfc
| 153 || September 20 || Brewers || 6–4 || Rivero (5–2) || Knebel (1–3) || — || 15,747 || 69–84 || W1
|- bgcolor=#fbb
| 154 || September 22 || Cardinals || 3–4 || Nicasio (5–5) || Rivero (5–3) || — || 23,942 || 69–85 || L1
|- bgcolor=#cfc
| 155 || September 23 || Cardinals || 11–6 || Cole (12–11) || Lynn (11–8) || — || 29,672 || 70–85 || W1
|- bgcolor=#cfc
| 156 || September 24 || Cardinals || 4–1 || Taillon (8–7) || Oh (1–6) || Rivero (19) || 28,550 || 71–85 || W2
|- bgcolor=#cfc
| 157 || September 26 || Orioles || 10–1 || Williams (7–9) || Gausman (11–11) || Brault (1) || 19,318 || 72–85 || W3
|- bgcolor=#cfc
| 158 || September 27 || Orioles || 5–3 || Kuhl (8–11) || Ynoa (2–3) || Rivero (20) || 24,779 || 73–85 || W4
|- bgcolor=#fbb
| 159 || September 28 ||@ Nationals || 4–5 || Doolittle (2–0) || Hudson (2–7) || – || 26,380 || 73–86 || L1
|- bgcolor=#fbb
| 160 || September 29 ||@ Nationals || 1–6 || Strasburg (15–4) || Cole (12–12) || – || 36,339 || 73–87 || L2
|- bgcolor=#cfc
| 161 || September 30||@ Nationals || 4–1 || Kontos (3–6) || Kintzler (4–3) || Rivero (21) || 32,240 || 74–87 || W1
|- bgcolor=#cfc
| 162 || October 1 ||@ Nationals || 11–8 || Sánchez (1–0) || González (15–9) || Kontos (1) || 35,652 || 75–87 || W2
|-

|- 
| Legend:       = Win       = Loss       = PostponementBold = Pirates team member

 August 20 game vs St. Louis Cardinals to be played at BB&T Ballpark at Historic Bowman Field in Williamsport, Pennsylvania as part of the 2017 MLB Little League Classic.

Roster

Opening Day lineup

Disabled lists

7-day disabled list

10-day disabled list

60-day disabled list

Notable achievements

Awards
National League Pitcher of the Month
Iván Nova (April)

National League Player of the Month
Andrew McCutchen (June)

2017 Major League Baseball All-Star Game
Josh Harrison, INF, Reserve

National League Player of the Week
Andrew McCutchen (September 25-October 1)

Farm system

LEAGUE CHAMPIONS: Altoona

References

External links
 2017 Pittsburgh Pirates at Baseball Reference
 Pittsburgh Pirates official site

Pittsburgh Pirates seasons
Pittsburgh Pirates
Pittsburgh Pirates